Anaru may refer to:
 Anaru, a Japanese slang meaning "sodomy," from English "anal"
 Anaru, or Naruko Anjō, one of the leading characters in AnoHana